Kummayak (Nepali: कुम्मायक गाउपालिका ;) is a rural municipality in Panchthar district. Kummayak is formed by the merging of Yasok, Rani Gaun, Syangrumba and Mangjabung village development committees. Kummayak covers 129.30 km2 area with 16118 total population.

References 

Rural municipalities in Koshi Province
Populated places in Panchthar District
Rural municipalities of Nepal established in 2017
Rural municipalities in Panchthar District